MF Dow Jones News (MF-DJ), is an Italian press release service, owned by Class Editori in joint venture with Dow Jones. Produces reports for Class Editori, Borsa Italiana, Yahoo! Italia Finance and many others Italian banks and companies.

External links 
 
 MF Dow Jones on Yahoo! Italia Finance (in Italian)

News agencies based in Italy
Dow Jones & Company
Class Editori